Shen Zhu or God Pig, sometimes known as Holy pig (Traditional Chinese: 神豬, Simplified Chinese: 神猪;  Mandarin Pinyin: shénzhū, Wade–Giles: shen-chu, Hokkien POJ: sîn-tu), are pigs that have been chronically fattened for use in Hakka religious and cultural ceremonies, such as the Yimin Festival and the Lunar New Year celebration in Sanxia, northern Taiwan. Pigs are fattened in a process similar to gavage to make them as large as possible in preparation for contests and awards at the festival. The heaviest pig is declared the winner and the owner may receive a prize. The winning pig and other pigs entered into the contest are ritually killed as a sacrifice to the City God or a local deity, one popular temple that continues this tradition is Changfu Temple which is dedicated to Master Qingshui. However, contrary to popular belief, the pig is not sacrificed to Master Qingshui, but to the mountain deities. 

After being sacrificed, the hair of the winning pig is removed or the bristles shaved into patterns, and the skin is stretched across a metal frame. Further decorations are added, such as placing a pineapple in the pig's mouth. The stretched skin, along with the carcasses or stretched skins of the other fattened pigs, are then paraded on a float.

In urban areas with no access to farms housing such large animals, or places where objections based on cruelty to the pigs have been raised, the contests instead have become art projects for children to create decorated pig statues.

Controversy
The practice of feeding the pigs to become so heavy has been criticized as inhumane, partly because the great weights limit the pig's movements and strains their internal organs.

References

Pigs
Animal welfare
Chinese words and phrases
Force-feeding
Hakka culture in Taiwan
Taiwanese culture
Taiwanese folk religion